Flynn is an Irish surname or first name, an anglicised form of the Irish Ó Floinn, meaning "descendant of Flann" (a byname meaning "reddish (complexion)" or "ruddy"). The name is more commonly used as a surname rather than a first name.

According to John O'Donovan's 1849 works, the modern descendants of Lugaid mac Con include the O'Driscolls, O'Learys, Coffeys, Hennessys and Flynns of County Cork.

Notable persons with the surname

Acting 
 Barbara Flynn (born 1948), English actress
 Brandon Flynn (born 1993), American actor
 Daniel Flynn (actor) (born 1961), English actor
 Errol Flynn (1909–1959), Australian-American movie actor
 Jerome Flynn (born 1963), English actor and singer
 Jimmy Flynn (1934-2022), American actor
 Joe Flynn (American actor) (1924–1974), American actor
 Miriam Flynn (born 1952), American character and voice actress
 Neil Flynn (born 1960), American actor known for his role on the American TV series Scrubs
 Quinton Flynn (born 1964), American voice actor
 , American actor known for his role on the American TV series Zoey 101

Art and writing 
 Daniel J. Flynn, American conservative writer
 Gillian Flynn (born 1971), American writer
 Greg Flynn, Australian novelist
 John T. Flynn (1882–1964), U.S. journalist and writer
 Michael Flynn (writer) (born 1947), American science fiction writer
 Nick Flynn (born 1960), poet and writer
 Tom Flynn (author) (born 1955), journalist
 Vince Flynn (1966–2013), American writer

Law and policing 
 Edmund James Flynn (1847–1927), attorney in Canada
 Edward A. Flynn (born c. 1948), Chief of the Milwaukee Police Department
 William J. Flynn (1867–1928), director of the Bureau of Investigation from 1919 to 1921

Music 
 Billy Flynn (musician) (born 1956), American blues guitarist, singer and songwriter
 Charles O'Flynn, American songwriter
 Dave Flynn (born 1977), Irish composer and musician
 Jim Flynn (songwriter) (born 1938), American country music songwriter
 Johnny Flynn (musician) (born 1983), musician
 Liam O'Flynn, traditional Irish musician
 Matt Flynn (musician) (born 1970), drummer for the band Maroon 5
 Patrick Flynn (composer) (1936–2008), composer and conductor
 Patti Flynn (1937–2020), jazz singer, author, radio actress, model and social activist
 Robert Flynn, guitarist for the Bay Area metal band Machine Head

Politics and governance 
 Dan Flynn (politician) (born 1943), Texas politician
 Dennis Flynn, Canadian politician (1923–2003), 5th Toronto Metro Chairman 1984–1987
 Edward J. Flynn (1891–1953), American politician, Secretary of State of New York 1929–1939
 Elizabeth Gurley Flynn (1890–1964), political activist
 John Flynn (Irish politician) (died 1968), Fianna Fáil politician from Kerry
 John Flynn (New Brunswick politician) (born 1954), former bank manager and political figure in New Brunswick, Canada; represented York in the Legislative Assembly of New Brunswick from 1995 to 1999 as a Liberal member
 John Gerrard Flynn (born 1937), former British Ambassador to Venezuela, the Dominican Republic and Haiti, and Angola
 Marty Flynn (born 1975), American politician
 Michael Flynn (born 1958), retired U.S. Army Lieutenant General and former National Security Advisor
 Noriko Sawada Bridges Flynn (1923–2003), civil rights activist
 Pádraig Flynn (born 1939), Irish politician between 1977 and 1999
 Patrick Flynn (Canadian politician) (1921–1996), Canadian Liberal Party politician of Irish extraction
 Paul Flynn (politician) (1935–2019), British Labour Party MP for Newport West
 Raymond Flynn (born 1939), former mayor of Boston, Massachusetts

Science, medicine and academe 
 Colin P. Flynn, professor at the University of Illinois
 Ida M. Flynn (1942–2004) American computer scientist, textbook author, and professor
 James Robert Flynn, a.k.a. Jim Flynn (born 1934), intelligence researcher in New Zealand (the Flynn effect)
 John Flynn (minister) (1880–1951), Minister; founder of the Royal Flying Doctor Service of Australia
 Michael J. Flynn (born 1934), American computer scientist and inventor of Flynn's taxonomy

Sport 
 Ann Marie Flynn (born 1938), American high jumper
 Brian Flynn (born 1955), Welsh footballer
 Brian Flynn (baseball) (born 1990), American professional baseball player
 Brian Flynn (ice hockey) (born 1988), hockey player, Buffalo Sabres
 Christopher Flynn (born 1987), Welsh footballer
 Daniel Flynn (cricketer) (born 1985), New Zealand cricketer
 Don Flynn (1934–2010), football player, Dallas Texans, New York Jets
 Doug Flynn (born 1951), American baseball player
 Edward Flynn (boxer) (1909–1976), American boxer, gold medalist at the 1932 Olympic Games
 Eddie Flynn (1919–2002), Irish soccer player
 Furlong Flynn (1901-1977), American football player and aviation pioneer
 George Flynn (baseball) (1871–1901), professional baseball player; outfielder in the Major Leagues in 1896; played for the Chicago Colts
 John Flynn (baseball) (1883–1935), former baseball player
 John Flynn (footballer, born 1948), English footballer
 John Flynn (rugby league), rugby league footballer who played in the 1900s
 Jonny Flynn (born 1989), American basketball player
 JP Flynn (born 1993), American football player
 Lefty Satan Flynn (1917–?), British Honduran boxer, Jamaican dual-weight titleholder
 Malachi Flynn (born 1998), American basketball player
 Matt Flynn (born 1985), American football player
 Michael Flynn (footballer) (born 1980), Welsh soccer player (of Wigan, Gillingham etc., now Bradford City)
 Mike Flynn (American football) (born 1974), American football player
 Mike Flynn (baseball) (1872–1941), American baseball player
 Mike Flynn (basketball) (born 1953), American basketball player
 Mike Flynn (footballer) (born 1969), English footballer (of Preston N.E., Stockport etc., now Salford City)
 Patrick Flynn (athlete) (1894–1969), American Olympic medalist
 Patrick J. Flynn, Irish race horse trainer
 Paul Flynn (Gaelic footballer) (born 1986), Dublin Gaelic footballer
 Paul Flynn (Waterford hurler) (born 1974), Irish hurler for Waterford
 Ray Flynn (athlete) (born 1957), Irish middle-distance runner
 Ryan Flynn (footballer) (born 1988), Sheffield United and Scottish footballer
 Ted Flynn (1880–1965), Australian Rules footballer
 Tom Flynn (American football) (born 1962), retired NFL athlete

Other 
 Harry Joseph Flynn (1933–2019), American Roman Catholic Archbishop of the Archdiocese of Saint Paul and Minneapolis
 John Flynn (director) (1932–2007), American film director
 Michael T. Flynn (born 1958), U.S. major general; top military intelligence officer in Afghanistan
 Mike Flynn (radio host), American radio host
 Robyn Flynn, Canadian radio host at CKGM in Montreal

Characters 
 Billy Flynn, character from the musical Chicago
 Flynn Rider, character from the animated film Tangled
 Harry Flynn, a villain character in the video game Uncharted 2: Among Thieves
 Helen Flynn, character from Spooks
 Janet O'Flynn, fictional character in Survival of the Dead
 Kevin Flynn, one of the main characters of the 1982 Walt Disney Pictures film Tron
 Sam Flynn, son of Kevin Flynn on the 2010 film Tron: Legacy
 Mickey Flynn, character in the novel Homeward Bound
 Patrick O'Flynn, fictional character
 Phineas, Linda, and Candace Flynn, from the Disney Channel animated series Phineas and Ferb
 Inspector Francis Xavier Flynn, the main character in a series of detective novels by Gregory Mcdonald
 The Flynn family in the sitcom In with the Flynns
 "Flynn", preferred nickname for Walter White Jr. in season 2 and sporadically onwards of AMC's Breaking Bad
 Flynn, default name for the protagonist of Shin Megami Tensei IV
 Flynn Carsen, main protagonist in The Librarian films and also guest star in the spin-off TV series The Librarians
Father Brendan Flynn, character from the play Doubt
Flynne Fisher, protagonist in The Peripheral.

See also
Flinn (surname)
Flyn

References

Surnames of Irish origin
English-language surnames